Shilaoren Beach is a station on Line 2 of the Qingdao Metro. It opened on 10 December 2017.

Gallery

References

Qingdao Metro stations
Railway stations in China opened in 2017